Baghu or Baghoo may refer to:
 Baghu (area)
 Baghu, Golestan
 Baghu Kenareh, Golestan Province
 Baghu, Hormozgan
 Baghu, Bandar Lengeh, Hormozgan Province
 Baghu, Qeshm, Hormozgan Province
 Baghu, alternate name of Baghuiyeh, Sarduiyeh, Kerman Province
 Baghu, alternate name of Baghat, Kerman, Kerman Province